Alberto Iván Covarrubias Rocha (born ) is a Mexican male  track cyclist. He competed in the scratch event at the 2014 UCI Track Cycling World Championships.

References

External links
 Profile at cyclingarchives.com

1994 births
Living people
Mexican track cyclists
Mexican male cyclists
Sportspeople from Monterrey